The Bobâlna is a right tributary of the river Mureș in Transylvania, Romania. It discharges into the Mureș in the village Bobâlna.

References

Rivers of Romania
Rivers of Hunedoara County